Parliamentary elections were held in Cyprus on 5 July 1970. The result was a victory for Eniaion, which won 15 of the 35 seats despite AKEL receiving a far larger share of the vote.

Results

References

Legislative election
Cyprus
Legislative elections in Cyprus
Cypriot legislative election